David G. Bassett is a United States Army lieutenant general who serves as the Director of the Defense Contract Management Agency. Previously, he was the Program Executive Officer for Command, Control and Communication (Tactical) of the United States Army.

References

External links

Year of birth missing (living people)
Living people
Place of birth missing (living people)
United States Army generals